Charles Douglas, 3rd Baron Douglas of Douglas (26 October 1775 – 10 September 1848) was an English amateur cricketer who made 13 known appearances in first-class cricket matches from 1797 to 1799.

He was Member of Parliament (MP) for Lanarkshire from 1830 to 1832.

He succeeded as 3rd Baron Douglas of Douglas in January 1844 and died unmarried. The titles passed to his younger brother, the Reverend James Douglas.

He was a member of Marylebone Cricket Club (MCC).

References

 

1775 births
1848 deaths
English cricketers
English cricketers of 1787 to 1825
Marylebone Cricket Club cricketers
Charles Douglas, 3rd Baron Douglas
3
Members of the Parliament of the United Kingdom for Scottish constituencies
UK MPs 1830–1831
UK MPs 1831–1832
UK MPs who inherited peerages
Colonel C. Lennox's XI cricketers